Patricio Fernández (born 10 November 1994 in Argentina) is an Argentine rugby union player who plays for  in the Rugby Pro D2. His playing position is fly-half. He previously represented Argentina Sevens and Argentina U20. His performances in France saw him named in the Argentina squad for the 2021 internationals.

Reference list

External links
itsrugby.co.uk profile

1994 births
Argentine rugby union players
Living people
ASM Clermont Auvergne players
Lyon OU players
USA Perpignan players
Rugby union fly-halves